María Luisa Merlo Colomina (born 6 September 1941) is a Spanish film, theatre and television actress.

Merlo, with more than 60 years of artistic career, has received the prestigious Gold Medal of Merit in the Fine Arts from the Spanish Ministry of Culture.

Early life
Merlo was born in Valencia in 1941. She is the daughter of actors Ismael Merlo Piquer and María Luisa Colomina Domingo.

She was raised following her parents theatre company, as a result, she was able to attend school for less than two years.

Career

Merlo made her debut as a dancer in the 1957 show Te espero en el Eslava by Luis Escobar Kirkpatrick.

She made her cinema debut in 1959 with José María Forqué in the film De espaldas a la puerta. Other titles followed during the first half of the sixties, such as Siempre es domingo (1961) by Fernando Palacios, Cuidado con las personas formales (1961) by Agustín Palacios, Más bonita que ninguna (1965) by Luis César Amadori, with Rocío Dúrcal, and De cuerpo presente (1967) by Antonio Eceiza.

However, from 1965 onward, she focused more on her theatre and television career.

Since the mid-sixties she has become a regular face on Spanish television, playing dozens of roles in Primera fila, Novela and Estudio 1.

In 1973, she starred alongside her then-husband Carlos Larrañaga in the TVE comedy Compañera te doy. 13 years later, she played alongside her daughter, Amparo Larrañaga, in the series Media naranja; in 2006, she did the same with her son, Luis Merlo, in Aquí no hay quien viva.

She has also appeared in the series Aquí hay negocio (1995), Luna negra (2003), Mis adorable vecinos (2004), Supervillanos (2006), Los Serrano (2008) and Somos cómplices (2009).

At the end of 2007, she participated in the sixth edition of the television contest ¡Mira quién baila!

In July 2013, she starred in the short film Betiko, directed by Arantza Ibarra, together with the actor Javier Pradera in the caves of Zugarramurdi.

Personal life

Merlo was married to the actor Carlos Larrañaga for 15 years; they separated in 1975 and obtained a divorce in November 1983. Besides a son, Juan Carlos, from Carlos previous marriage, they had three children: Amparo Larrañaga, Luis Merlo and Pedro.

In 1992, she married university professor Michael Kenton, with whom she divorced five years later.

An authoritative biography of Merlo, María Luisa Merlo: Más allá del teatro, was published in 2003 by Pedro Manuel Víllora Gallardo.

Filmography

Film

Television

Theatre
Her career on the stage is marked by the performance of works of all genres, from drama to comedy, including musicals. In 1986 she joined the Compañía Nacional de Teatro Clásico.

Awards

In 1967, Merlo was awarded with the Antena de Oro de Televisión Prize. She was awarded the Ercilla Theatre Prize in 2009 for her career in theatre. In 2013, she was awarded the Distinction of the Generalitat Valenciana for Cultural Merit. The Spanish Ministry of Culture awarded Merlo the Gold Medal of Merit in the Fine Arts in 2017.

References

External links 
 
 

1941 births
Living people
People from Valencia
Spanish film actresses
Spanish stage actresses
20th-century Spanish actresses
21st-century Spanish actresses